Strange in Stereo is the third full-length studio album by the Norwegian progressive/avant-garde metal band In the Woods...

Track listing

References

External links
 Complete album on Myspace

1999 albums
In the Woods... albums